Eagle Stadium is a football stadium in Allen, Texas. It is owned and operated by the Allen Independent School District and is home of the Allen High School Eagles.

History
The stadium opened on August 31, 2012, with a non-district matchup between Allen and Southlake Carroll, who at the time was the defending 5A state champion and the No. 1 ranked team in the state. In an upset, Allen prevailed, 24–0, en route to its own state title later that year. The Eagles have enjoyed remarkable success since opening the stadium winning 54 consecutive games in the stadium from 2012–2021. Atascocita became the first team to beat the Eagles at the venue on September 3, 2021. Allen has won four state championships (2012, 2013, 2014, and 2017) since Eagle Stadium opened, and five overall (2008).

Eagle Stadium is notable (and controversial) for its size (it has a capacity of 18,000 spectators, the fifth largest high school stadium in Texas, and the largest which serves as home field for only one high school) and its cost of completion (just under US$60 million).  The 18,000 seats include 9,000 home-side seats (including 1,000 reserved for the Allen Escadrille), 4,000 end-zone seats for students and general admission (located in the north end zone), and 5,000 visitor-side seats.

Beneath the grandstand there are spaces for wrestling, a golf simulator practice area, and a weight room.

The final Texas vs The Nation college football all-star bowl game was held at Eagle Stadium in February, 2013.

Cracking and temporary closure
On February 27, 2014, the stadium was closed due to cracking in concrete to ensure the safety of visitors. All future events were canceled until further notice. In a letter to the design and construction companies for the stadium, lawyers for the school district cited "construction failures" that exacerbated "already deficient design."

Repairs costing more than $10 million were made at the expense of the builder and architect, and the stadium was officially reopened on June 5, 2015, for graduation.

Use as a COVID-19 vaccine distribution hub
On January 19, 2021, Allen ISD and the City of Allen partnered to use the parking lot of Eagle Stadium as a COVID-19 vaccine distribution center during the COVID-19 pandemic. Officials deemed the stadium an, "ideal location," due to its size and ease of access to residents. The Allen Fire Department estimated the stadium could be administer up to 1,000 vaccinations per day.

Year-by-year win–loss record

1. Includes 2012 1st round playoff victory over Richardson High School.

2. Allen was unable to play any games in the stadium during the 2014 season due to repairs. Allen reached an agreement with neighboring Plano ISD to play 3 "home games" using 2 of Plano's Stadiums. As a part of the agreement Allen hosted 8 home games (as opposed to the normal 5 home games) in the 2015 season.

3. Includes 2015 1st round playoff victory over Byron Nelson High School.

4. Includes 2016 1st round playoff victory over Trinity High School.

5. Includes 2017 1st round playoff victory over Hebron High School.

6. Includes 2020 1st round playoff victory over Plano West High School.

7. A regular season home game against Tyler Legacy High School was canceled after players tested positive for COVID-19.

8. Allen lost at Eagle Stadium for the first time on September 3, 2021 during a regular season game against Atascocita High School.

9. Includes 2021 1st round playoff victory over Hebron High School and 3rd round playoff victory over Trinity High School.

References

External links
 Eagle Stadium Information Update Page
 Eagle Stadium website
 Philly.com article
 Rivals.com article
 ESPN Cracks force closure

Sports in Allen, Texas
American football venues in the Dallas–Fort Worth metroplex
High school football venues in Texas
Sports venues completed in 2012
2012 establishments in Texas
Buildings and structures in Allen, Texas